is Thelma Aoyama's fifth single, and her last in 2009. It was released on  December 10, 2008. The song "Daikkirai Demo Arigato" is a collaboration with Dreams Come True, whom Aoyama has been a fan of since she was in kindergarten. The song is also featured on Dreams Come True's album "Do You Dreams Come True?" with vocals by the band. "Walk" was written by Aoyama herself.

Track listing

Charting and release 
The single debuted at #12 on the Oricon Weekly Chart and sold 9,815 physical copies that week. Total sales for "Daikkirai Demo Arigato" are 17,432.

Oricon Charts

Billboard Japan Charts

External links 
 Oricon Profile
 Official Discography

2008 singles
2008 songs
Thelma Aoyama songs
Songs written by Miwa Yoshida
Universal J singles